There were several independent candidates in the 1987 provincial election, none of whom were elected.  Information about these candidates may be found on this page.

Camilo Tiqui (Parkdale)

Tiqui was a perennial candidate for public office in Toronto.  He was an intelligence officer in the Philippine military, and moved to Canada in 1976.  He later worked for De Havilland as an aircraft technologist.  Tiqui was fifty-one years old in 1987, and campaigned in favour of a more equitable system of taxation.

He tried to challenge Sergio Marchi for the Liberal nomination in York West in the 1988 federal election, but was ruled ineligible on the grounds that his nomination papers were misfiled.

Tiqui expressed concern about overpopulation in the Toronto's Black Creek area during the 1988 campaign.  He called for increased multicultural programs in 1991.  In addition to the campaigns listed below, Tiqui also applied to become Mario Gentile's replacement on the Metro Toronto Council in 1994 (council chose to appoint Gentile's successor rather than call a by-election).  He was rejected in favour of another candidate.

Tiqui is active with the Boy Scouts organization.

Footnotes

1987